was the 117th monarch of Japan, according to the traditional order of succession. She was named after her father Emperor Sakuramachi, the word go- (後) before her name translates in this context as "later" or "second one". Her reign spanned the years from 1762 through to her abdication in 1771. The only significant event during her reign was an unsuccessful outside plot, that intended to displace the shogunate with restored imperial powers.

Empress Go-Sakuramachi and her brother Emperor Momozono were the last lineal descendants of Emperor Nakamikado. Her nephew succeeded her as Emperor Go-Momozono upon her abdication in 1771. Go-Momozono died eight years later after a serious illness with no heir to the throne. A possible succession crisis was averted when Go-Momozono hastily adopted an heir on his deathbed upon the insistence of his aunt. In her later years, Go-Sakuramachi became a "guardian" to the adopted heir, Emperor Kōkaku, until her death in 1813. In the history of Japan, Go-Sakuramachi was the last of eight women to take on the role of empress regnant.

Events of Go-Sakuramachi's life

Early life
Toshiko was born into the Imperial family on 23 September 1740 she was the second daughter of Emperor Sakuramachi, and her mother was Nijō Ieko (二条 舎子). Toshiko had an older sister who died at a young age, and a brother named Toohito who became Emperor Momozono upon the death of their father in 1747. The empress and her Emperor brother were the last lineal descendants of Emperor Nakamikado.

Reign

On 15 September 1762 Princess Toshiko acceded to the throne as Empress when her brother Emperor Momozono abdicated in her favor. Momozono's son, Prince Hidehito (later to be known as Emperor Go-Momozono) was only 4 years old at this time. Hidehito's empress aunt was expected to occupy the throne until her nephew would be able to take on the burden of responsibility. While she held the political title of Empress, it was in name only as the shoguns (generalissimos) of the Tokugawa family controlled Japan. There was only one major incident during Go-Sakuramachi's reign in 1766, which involved unsuccessful plans to displace the shogunate with restored Imperial powers. While the attempt was thwarted, additional challenges to the shōgun's authority would come a decade or so later under the reign of Emperor Kōkaku. Other events in Go-Sakuramachi's life included the founding of a merchant association handling Korean ginseng in the Kanda district of Edo. The year 1770 saw a great comet (Lexell's Comet) with a very long tail light up the night skies throughout the summer and autumn. During the same year two major disasters unfolded which included a typhoon that flattened the newly built Imperial Palace in Kyoto, and the start of a 15 year consecutive drought. Go-Sakuramachi abdicated on 9 January 1771 in favor of her nephew Hidehito.

Daijō Tennō

Go-Sakuramachi became a Daijō-tennō (Retired Empress) upon her abdication, but her nephew's reign as Emperor did not last long. Emperor Go-Momozono became deathly ill in 1779, and having no heir to the throne this created a potential succession crisis. Go-Sakuramachi consulted with the senior courtiers and imperial guards, and planned to accept Prince Sadayoshi of Fushimi-no-miya as an adopted son. For one reason or another the choice went instead to Prince Morohito, who was a member of the Kanin branch of the Imperial family. Morohito was the sixth son of Prince Kan'in-no-miya Sukehito (閑院宮典仁), and was supported by the Emperor's chief advisor (aka the Kampaku). Go-Momozono hastily adopted Prince Morohito, who became Emperor Kōkaku upon his death on 6 December 1779. After the throne had switched to that branch of the imperial line, Go-Sakuramachi came to be referred to as the Guardian of the Young Lord, referred to the Emperor. The largest event that took place before her death occurred in 1789, when she admonished Kōkaku for his role in a scandal involving his father's honorary title. The former empress Go-Sakuramachi died on 24 December 1813 at the age of 73.

Go-Sakuramachi's kami is enshrined in the Imperial mausoleum (misasagi), Tsuki no wa no misasagi, at Sennyū-ji in Higashiyama-ku, Kyoto.  Also enshrined in this location are this empress's immediate Imperial predecessors since Emperor Go-Mizunoo – Meishō, Go-Kōmyō, Go-Sai, Reigen, Higashiyama, Nakamikado, Sakuramachi and Momozono, along with her four immediate successors – Go-Momozono, Kōkaku, Ninkō, and Kōmei.

Legacy 

In the history of Japan, Go-Sakuramachi was the last of eight women to take on the role of empress regnant. She is also credited with creating a book called , which consists of poems, Imperial letters and Imperial chronicles. Although there were seven other reigning empresses, their successors were most often selected from amongst the males of the paternal Imperial bloodline. For this reason, some scholars have suggested that these reigns were temporary, and argued that the male-only succession tradition must be maintained in the 21st century. The sole exception to this tradition occurred when Empress Genmei was followed on the throne by her daughter, Empress Genshō. The other five women to rule as empress with male heirs include: Suiko, Kōgyoku (Saimei), Jitō, Kōken (Shōtoku), and Meishō. After the Meiji Restoration (1868), Japan imported the Prussian model of imperial succession, in which princesses were explicitly excluded from succession. The debate to allow succession laws to be changed allowing for a possible future empress continue to this day, most recently with Princess Toshi in 2005.

Eras and Kugyō
The years of Go-Sakuramachi's reign are more specifically identified by more than one era name or nengō. While , is a collective term for the very few most powerful men attached to the court of the Emperor of Japan in pre-Meiji eras. Even during those years in which the court's actual influence outside the palace walls was minimal, the hierarchic organization persisted. In general, this elite group included only three to four men at a time. These were hereditary courtiers whose experience and background would have brought them to the pinnacle of a life's career.

The following eras occurred during Go-Sakuramachi's reign:

 Hōreki (1751–1764)
 Meiwa  (1764–1772)

During Go-Sakuramachi's reign, this apex of the Daijō-kan included: 
 Sadaijin
 Udaijin
 Naidaijin
 Dainagon

Ancestry

See also
 Empress of Japan
 Emperor of Japan
 List of emperors of Japan
 Japanese imperial succession debate
 Imperial cult
 Modern system of ranked Shinto shrines

Notes

References
 Brinkley, Frank. (1907).   A History of the Japanese People from the Earliest Times to the End of the Meiji Era.  New York: Encyclopædia Britannica.   OCLC 413099
 Hall, John Whitney. (1988). The Cambridge History of Japan, Vol. 4. Early Modern Japan. Cambridge: Cambridge University Press. ;   OCLC 489633115
 Meyer, Eva-Maria. (1999).  Japans Kaiserhof in der Edo-Zeit: unter besonderer Berücksichtigung der Jahre 1846 bis 1867.  Münster: LIT Verlag. 	;   OCLC 42041594
 Ponsonby-Fane, Richard. (1956). Kyoto: The Old Capital of Japan, 794–1869. Kyoto: Ponsonby Memorial Society. 
 __. (1959). The Imperial House of Japan. Kyoto: Ponsonby Memorial Society. OCLC 194887
 Screech, Timon. (2006). Secret Memoirs of the Shoguns: Isaac Titsingh and Japan, 1779–1822. London: RoutledgeCurzon. ; OCLC 65177072
 Titsingh, Isaac. (1834).  Annales des empereurs du Japon (Nihon Ōdai Ichiran).  Paris: Royal Asiatic Society, Oriental Translation Fund of Great Britain and Ireland. OCLC 5850691

 Women rulers in Japan
Japanese retired emperors
1740 births
1813 deaths
Japanese empresses regnant
Empress Go-Sakuramachi
Empress Go-Sakuramachi
Empress Go-Sakuramachi
Empress Go-Sakuramachi
Empress Go-Sakuramachi
18th-century Japanese women
18th-century Japanese monarchs
19th-century Japanese people
Japanese princesses